National Route 204 is a national highway of Japan connecting Karatsu, Saga and Sasebo, Nagasaki in Japan, with a total length of 157 km (97.56 mi).

References

National highways in Japan
Roads in Nagasaki Prefecture
Roads in Saga Prefecture